The 2019 Shimadzu All Japan Indoor Tennis Championships was a professional tennis tournament played on indoor hard courts. It was the first edition of the women's tournament which was part of the 2019 ITF Women's World Tennis Tour. It took place in Kyoto, Japan between 18 and 24 February 2019.

Singles main-draw entrants

Seeds

 1 Rankings are as of 11 February 2019.

Other entrants
The following players received wildcards into the singles main draw:
  Mai Hontama
  Miharu Imanishi
  Haruka Kaji
  Naho Sato

The following players received entry from the qualifying draw:
  Eri Hozumi
  Megumi Nishimoto
  Kyōka Okamura
  Akiko Omae
  Moyuka Uchijima
  Zhang Ling

Champions

Singles

 Ylena In-Albon def.  Zhang Kailin, 6–2, 6–3

Doubles

 Eri Hozumi /  Moyuka Uchijima def.  Chen Pei-hsuan /  Wu Fang-hsien, 6–4, 6–3

References

External links
 2019 Shimadzu All Japan Indoor Tennis Championships at ITFtennis.com
 Official website 

All Japan Indoor Tennis Championships
2019 ITF Women's World Tennis Tour
2019 in Japanese tennis
February 2019 sports events in Japan